Árpád Szakasits  (6 December 1888 – 3 May 1965) was a Hungarian Social Democrat, then Communist politician. He served as the country's head of state from 1948 to 1950, the first Communist to hold the post.

A longtime leader of the Hungarian Social Democratic Party, he supported its merger with the Hungarian Communist Party to form the Hungarian Working People's Party. When President Zoltán Tildy was forced to resign, Szakasits was named his successor on 3 August 1948 as part of the final stage of the Communists' complete takeover of the country.

After the adoption of a new Soviet-style Constitution in 1949, the presidency was replaced with a Presidential Council, and Szakasits became its chairman on 23 August 1949, serving until 26 April 1950.

Szakasits was an Esperantist for over 40 years, attended Esperanto congresses, and was a member of the International Patron Committee for the World Esperanto Congress in 1959.

Personal life
Szakasits was married to Emma Grosz (1888–1954). They had together a son, György (1916–1985) and a daughter, Klára (1918–2001). After the death of his first wife, he remarried. His second wife was Maria Theresia Schneider. This marriage was childless.

His daughter Klára was the grandmother of Hungarian politician, András Schiffer, the founder and onetime leader of the Politics Can Be Different political party.

References

External links
 

1888 births
1965 deaths
Politicians from Budapest
People from the Kingdom of Hungary
Social Democratic Party of Hungary politicians
Members of the Hungarian Working People's Party
Members of the Hungarian Socialist Workers' Party
Presidents of Hungary
Members of the National Assembly of Hungary (1945–1947)
Members of the National Assembly of Hungary (1947–1949)
Members of the National Assembly of Hungary (1958–1963)
Members of the National Assembly of Hungary (1963–1967)
Hungarian Esperantists
Heads of government who were later imprisoned
Burials at Farkasréti Cemetery